Nodding disease is a disease which emerged in Sudan in the 1960s. It is a mentally and physically disabling disease that only affects children, typically between the ages of 5 and 15. It is currently restricted to small regions in South Sudan, Tanzania, and northern Uganda. Prior to the South Sudan outbreaks and subsequent limited spread, the disease was first described in 1962 existing in secluded mountainous regions of Tanzania, although the connection between that disease and nodding syndrome was only made recently.

Signs and symptoms 
Children affected by nodding disease experience a complete and permanent stunting of growth. The growth of the brain is also stunted, leading to intellectual disability. The disease is named for the characteristic, pathological nodding seizure, which often begins when the children begin to eat, or sometimes when they feel cold. These seizures are brief and halt after the children stop eating or when they feel warm again. Seizures in nodding disease span a wide range of severity. Neurotoxicologist Peter Spencer, who has investigated the disease, has stated that upon presentation with food, "one or two [children] will start nodding very rapidly in a continuous, pendulous nod. A nearby child may suddenly go into a tonic–clonic seizure, while others will freeze." Severe seizures can cause the child to collapse, leading to further injury. Sub-clinical seizures have been identified in electroencephalograms, and MRI scans have shown brain atrophy and damage to the hippocampus and glia cells.

It has been found that no seizures occur when affected individuals are given an unfamiliar or non-traditional food, such as chocolate.

Causes 
It is currently not known what causes the disease, but it is believed to be connected to infestations of the parasitic worm Onchocerca volvulus, which is prevalent in all outbreak areas, and a possible explanation involves the formation of antibodies against parasite antigen that are cross-reactive to leiomodin-1 in the hippocampus. O. volvulus, a nematode, is carried by the black fly and causes river blindness. In 2004, most children with nodding disease lived close to the Yei River, a hotbed for river blindness, and 93.7% of those with nodding disease were found to harbour the parasite — a far higher percentage than in children without the disease. A link between river blindness and normal cases of epilepsy, as well as retarded growth, had been proposed previously, although the evidence for this link is inconclusive. Of the connection between the worm and the disease, Scott Dowell, the lead investigator into the syndrome for the US Centers for Disease Control and Prevention (CDC), stated: "We know that [Onchocerca volvulus] is involved in some way, but it is a little puzzling because [the worm] is fairly common in areas that do not have nodding disease". Andrea Winkler, the first author of a 2008 Tanzanian study, has said of the connection: "We could not establish any hint that Onchocerca volvulus is actually going into the brain, but what we cannot exclude is that there is an autoimmune mechanism going on." In the most severely affected region of Uganda, infection with microfilariae in epileptic or nodding children ranged from 70% to 100%.

The CDC is investigating a possible connection with wartime chemical exposure. The team is also investigating whether a deficiency in vitamin B6 (pyridoxine) could be a cause, noting the seizures of pyridoxine-dependent epilepsy and this common deficiency in those with the disease. Older theories include a 2002 toxicology report that postulated a connection with tainted monkey meat, as well as the eating of agricultural seeds provided by relief agencies that were covered in toxic chemicals.

Diagnosis
Diagnosis is not very advanced and is based on the telltale nodding seizures of the patients. When stunted growth and mental disability are also present, probability of nodding syndrome is high. In the future, neurological scans may also be used in diagnosis.

Management
As there is no known cure for the disease, treatment has been directed at symptoms, and has included the use of anticonvulsants such as sodium valproate and phenobarbitol. Anti-malaria drugs have also been administered, to unknown effect. Nutritional deficiencies may also be present.

Prognosis 
Nodding syndrome is debilitating both physically and mentally. In 2004, Peter Spencer stated: "It is, by all reports, a progressive disorder and a fatal disorder, perhaps with a duration of about three years or more." While a few children are said to have recovered from it, many have died from the illness. Seizures can also cause children to collapse, potentially causing injury or death.

Epidemiology

While the majority of occurrences of the disease known as "nodding syndrome" have been relatively recent, it appears that the condition was first documented in 1962 in southern Tanzania. More recently, nodding syndrome had become most prevalent in South Sudan, where in 2003 approximately 300 cases were found in Mundri alone. By 2009, it had spread across the border to Uganda's Kitgum district, and the Ugandan ministry of health declared that more than 2000 children had the disease. As of the end of 2011, outbreaks were concentrated in Kitgum, Pader and Gulu. More than 1000 cases were diagnosed in the last half of that year.

There were further outbreaks in early 2012, in South Sudan, Uganda, and Tanzania.

The spread and manifestation of outbreaks may further be exacerbated due to the poor availability of health care in the region.

See also
 List of mystery diseases

References

External links 

 

Ailments of unknown cause
Health in Africa
Health in Sudan
Rare diseases
Syndromes